The Winnipeg International Writers Festival is a Winnipeg, Manitoba based organization that puts together an annual literary festival known as THIN AIR. The festival program runs for a week each fall, and there are also several off-season events regularly occurring throughout the year. Programming is available in both English and French. While most of the events occur in Winnipeg, there are also some at Brandon University and throughout the province.

History
The Winnipeg International Writers Festival was founded by Andris Taskans, Mark Steven Morton, and Robyn Maharaj in 1996, with the first festival running from October 14 to 19 of the following year. The festival hosted approximately 50 writers from across Canada and around the world. The creation of the festival was explained as follows: "It grew out of the determination to see that the writing, reading and publishing community was being served the way other [Winnipeg] cultural communities were being served.

"You have music aficionados being offered events such as the Jazz Festival and the New Music Festival, theatre-goers have the Fringe Festival - we're a festival town. People like to have large-scale events which offer them a lot of choice and that's what we wanted to do for the writing community." - Paula Kelly, coordinator for the 1997 Winnipeg Writers Festival, quoted in The Manitoban.

The festival involved collaboration from a number of organizations, including Prairie Fire, the Manitoba Writers' Guild, the West End Cultural Centre (which had previously hosted a Word on the Street series), the Interfaith Marriage and Family Institute, and the University of Winnipeg. In addition, Balmoral Hall School hosted a number of school events related to the festival.

Since that time the THIN AIR festival has become a regular fixture in the province.

Current Staff

Currently the Winnipeg International Writers Festival is staffed by Director Charlene Diehl, General Manager Perry Grosshans, Administrative Coordinator Aaron Simm, and Coordonnatrice Karen San Filippo.

2009 THIN AIR Programming
The 2009 THIN AIR festival ran from September 20 to 27. During this week writers including France Adams, Jan Andrews, Elizabeth Bachinsky, Christian Bök, Bonnie Burnard, George Elliott Clarke, Beth (Johnston) Cruikshank, Cyril Dabydeen, Nick DiChario, Deborah Ellis, Lesley Fairfield, Endre Farkas, Jon Paul Fiorentino, Linda Frank, Marie-Louise Gay, Charlotte Gingras, Terry Griggs, Catherine Hunter, Lynn Johnston, Judith Keenan, Lauren Kirshner, Jacqueline Larson, Charles Leblanc, J.R. Léveillé, Jeanette Lynes, Jake MacDonald, Guy Maddin, Hal Niedzviecki, David O'Meara, Marc Prescott, Lorraine Pritchard, T'ai Pu, Mélanie Rocan, Serge Salvador, Robert J Sawyer, Deborah Schnitzer, Gregory Scofield, Anne Sechin, Struan Sinclair, Carolyn Marie Souaid, Margaret Sweatman, CJ Taylor, Serge Patrice Thibodeau, George Toles, Rhea Tregebov, Priscila Uppal, Robert Charles Wilson, and Tim Wynne-Jones will be performing readings, workshops and discussions throughout Manitoba.

Some events planned include the Mainstage readings at the CanWest Global Performing Arts Centre at The Forks, Afternoon Book Chats at the McNally Robinson Polo Park Bookstore, The Nooner and Big Ideas at the Millennium Winnipeg Public Library, and After Words and A Pint of Bitter Murder at Aqua Books.

2008 Programming
The 2008 festival ran from September 21 to 28. During the week, 73 writers did readings, workshops and discussions at various sites throughout Winnipeg.

The mainstage and school stage events occurred at CanWest Global Performing Arts Centre at The Forks. The Campus Program events were at the University of Winnipeg, the University of Manitoba, Red River College, Canadian Mennonite University, and Brandon University. The French program, Foyer des Écrivains, was at the Centre culturel Franco-manitobain in St. Boniface. The Rural Tour covered Brandon, Altona, Morden, Holland, Portage la Prairie, Selkirk, and Carman. There were also events at Winnipeg Public Library, Aqua Books, and McNally Robinson, among other locations.

References

External links
Official site of Winnipeg International Writers Festival

Literary festivals in Manitoba
Festivals in Winnipeg
Annual events in Winnipeg